Jordi Aláez Peña (born 23 January 1998) is an Andorran professional footballer who plays as a midfielder for Greek Super League 2 club Diagoras.

Playing career

Club career
Aláez quickly progressed through the youth ranks of FC Andorra, a club based in Andorra but playing in the Spanish football league system. As part of the "juvenile" (U18) team, he helped them achieve a near perfect season (25 wins, 3 draws, 1 loss) in 2014–15 to achieve promotion to the third-tier.  He was called up to the first squad (playing in the fifth-tier Primera Catalana) before the start of the 2015–16 season. He made his debut less than a month after his 18th birthday, replacing Alexandre Martínez in the 79' of a 4-0 home win against UA Horta on February 14, 2016.

International career

Youth

Aláez made his debut for the Andorra under-17 national team in October 2013, playing all three matches in the 2014 Euro U17 qualifiers (against Serbia, Greece and Estonia, respectively). He was 15 years old. He subsequently captained Andorra U17 at the following year's qualifiers, recording one assist in three games as they failed to pass the group stage once again.

He also appeared in five matches for the Andorra national under-19 team, three times in the 2015 Euro U19 qualifiers in Poland and twice in the 2016 Euro 19 qualifiers in Romania.

His debut with the Andorra national under-21 team was on March 26, 2015, where he played the full 90 minutes in a 1-0 loss to the Republic of Ireland.

Senior
Aláez made his senior international debut for Andorra by playing the full 90 minutes of a 0-0 draw in a friendly against Azerbaijan on May 26, 2016. Aláez was among the four "fresh faces" with no previous senior international experience that manager Koldo Álvarez decided to include in the 18-man squad the day before the match, showing great confidence in the young players. He earned his second cap a week later, coming on as a 65' substitute for Alexandre Martínez during a 2-0 loss to Estonia in Tallinn.

National team statistics

International goals
Scores and results list Andorra's goal tally first.

References

External links

 
 
 
 Jordi Aláez at LaPreferente.com 
 

1998 births
Living people
People from Sant Julià de Lòria
Andorran people of Spanish descent
Andorran people of Catalan descent
Andorran footballers
Andorran beach soccer players
Andorra international footballers
Andorra youth international footballers
Association football midfielders
FC Andorra players
Andorra under-21 international footballers